Malcolm Maclean may refer to:
Malcolm Alexander MacLean (1842–1895), first Mayor of Vancouver, British Columbia
Malcolm Roderick Maclean (1919–2001), politician from Georgia, USA
Malcolm Maclean, 3rd Chief (fl. 1310s), 3rd Chief of Clan Maclean
Malcolm MacLean (rower), British rower

See also
Malcom McLean (1913–2001), American entrepreneur
Malcolm McLean (politician) (1883–1942), Canadian politician